The brown woodland warbler (Phylloscopus umbrovirens) is a species of Old World warbler in the family Phylloscopidae.

Distribution and habitat
It is found in Democratic Republic of the Congo, Djibouti, Eritrea, Ethiopia, Kenya, Rwanda, Saudi Arabia, Somalia, South Sudan, Tanzania, Uganda, and Yemen.  Its natural habitats are boreal forests, subtropical or tropical moist montane forests, and subtropical or tropical dry shrubland.

Status
Its population is assumed to be stable, though no accurate estimates of its size have been made. The 2016 IUCN Red List classifies the species as one of least concern.

References

brown woodland warbler
Birds of Sub-Saharan Africa
Birds of East Africa
Birds of the Horn of Africa
Birds of the Middle East
brown woodland warbler
Taxonomy articles created by Polbot